So Hat Ni is a Burmese politician who currently serves as a Pyithu Hluttaw MP for Hsawlaw Township.

Political career
He is a member of the National League for Democracy. In the 2020 Myanmar general election, he was elected as a Pyithu Hluttaw MP and the elected representative for the Hsawlaw Township parliamentary constituency.

References

Living people
1986 births
People from Kachin State